Aciuropsis is a genus of tephritid  or fruit flies in the family Tephritidae.

There is only one species placed under the genus Aciuropsis, Aciuropsis pusio (Hardy, 1974).

References

Trypetinae
Tephritidae genera